Denklingen is a municipality in the district of Landsberg (also called Landsberg am Lech) in Bavaria in Germany. The former municipality of Epfach, which has a history back to the Roman period, is now part of Denklingen.

Geography
Denklingen is the most southwesterly municipality in the district of Landsberg. It is located on flats to the west of the Lech River. It is at the edge of Denklinger Rotwalds (red forest of Denklingen) and Sachsenrieder forest.

References

Landsberg (district)